iQue may refer to:
 
iQue, a Chinese video game company
Garmin iQue, a personal digital assistant with GPS